Colvillea is a genus of legume in the family Fabaceae. It is named for Sir Charles Colville, an ex Governor of Mauritius.
It contains the following species:
 Colvillea racemosa

References

External links 

Caesalpinioideae
Fabaceae genera
Taxonomy articles created by Polbot
Taxa named by Wenceslas Bojer
Taxa named by William Jackson Hooker